Freestyle Skiing at the 2012 Winter Youth Olympics was held at the Nordkette Innsbruck and Kuhtai in Igls, Innsbruck, Austria from 17 January to 22 January. The difference in the Youth Olympic program for freestyle skiing compared to the Winter Olympics was that there were no aerials or moguls competition for both genders, and an inclusion of a ski half-pipe for both genders.

Medal summary

Medal table

Events

Qualification System

References

 
2012 in freestyle skiing
2012 Winter Youth Olympics events
2012